Pulrose United A.F.C. is a football club from Douglas on the Isle of Man. They compete in the Isle of Man Football League. They play their home games at Pulrose Fields in Douglas.

History
Formed in 1932, they won their first trophy in the 1967–68 season when they were First Division champions. They were the Isle of Man champions for four seasons running, winning it again in 1968–69, 1969–70 and 1970–71. They also won the Manx FA Cup and the Woods Cup in 1970–71. They were relegated to Division Two and were promoted again in the 1989–90 season. They were Isle of Man champions again in 1992–93, also winning the Railway Cup and beating St Marys 5–0 in the final and were Manx FA Cup finalists, losing 4–1 to Castletown. The following season they were runners-up in the Railway Cup, losing 2–1 to Douglas High School Old Boys in the final.

They finished in last place and were again relegated to Division Two in the 1996–97 season. They were promoted again to the top flight in the 1999–2000 season. The 2002–03 season saw Pulrose again relegated in last place. However, they were promoted straight back up the following season as runners-up to Douglas Royal. They continued their roller-coaster ride between the leagues in the 2004–05 season, as they once again finished bottom in the top flight and were relegated. In the 2005–06 season they reached the final of the Manx FA Cup, where they lost 5–0 to Laxey on 17 April 2006.

They currently play in Division Two.

The club has a reserve team that play in the Isle of Man Football Combination.

Former notable players include Adam Williams, who won Player's Player of the Year for three consecutive seasons between 2011-2014. Williams also broke the club record for the most goals scored in a single season, scoring an impressive 42 goals in 21 appearances during the 2011-12 season.

Honours

First team

League
First Division champions (5): 1967–68, 1968–69, 1969–70, 1970–71, 1992–93

Cup
Manx FA Cup (1): 1970–71
finalists (2): 1992–93, 2005–06
Railway Cup (1): 1992–93
finalists (1): 1993–94
Woods Cup (1): 1970–71, 2017–18, 2018-2019
Hospital Cup finalists (1): 1968–69

Reserve team

Cup

Junior Cup (1):1982-83
Cowell Cup (2): 1994–95, 1997–98

References

External links
Division Two table at the fa.com

Football clubs in the Isle of Man
Association football clubs established in 1932
1932 establishments in the Isle of Man